A time capsule is a historic cache of goods or information, usually intended as a method of communication with future people.

Time Capsule may also refer to:

Film and TV
 "Time Capsule" (Parks and Recreation), an episode of the American comedy television series Parks and Recreation

Music
 Time Capsule: Songs for a Future Generation, a 1998 greatest hits album by the B-52's
 Time Capsule (Elvin Jones album), 1977
 Time Capsule (Fingathing album), a 2005 compilation of Fingathing's first three albums
 Time Capsule (Marxman album), a 1996 album by Marxman
 "Time Capsule", a song by Air
 "Time Capsule", a song by Matthew Sweet
 "Time Capsule", a song by The Network
 "Time Capsule", a song by Tokyo Jihen

Other
 AirPort Time Capsule, a wireless network-attached storage device combined with a wireless residential gateway router
 Time capsules, fixed patterns that create the appearance of motion or change according to Julian Barbour's timeless physics